100, in comics, may refer to:

100 (DC Comics), a DC Comics supervillain team
100% (comics), a 1992 series from Vertigo
100 Bullets, a series by Brian Azzarello from Vertigo
100 Girls (comics), a series from Arcana Studios

See also
100 (number)

References